The 2022 Magyar Kupa Final decided the winners of the 2021–22 Magyar Kupa, the 79th season of Hungarian premier football cup, the Magyar Kupa. It was played on 11 May 2022 between Ferencváros and Paks.

Ferencváros won the match 3–0 for their twenty-fourth Magyar Kupa title.

Route to the final

Key: (H) = Home; (A) = Away

Match

Details

References

External links
 Official site 

2022
Ferencvárosi TC matches